Hemiphyllodactylus ywanganensis, also known as the Ywangan slender gecko, is a species of gecko. It is endemic to Myanmar.

References

Hemiphyllodactylus
Reptiles described in 2018
Endemic fauna of Myanmar
Reptiles of Myanmar